Tehatta subdivision is an administrative subdivision of the Nadia district in the state of West Bengal, India.

Overview
Nadia district is part of the large alluvial plain formed by the Ganges-Bhagirathi system. The plains spread southwards from the head of the delta. The Tehatta subdivision is topographically part of the Nadia Plain North. The Jalangi River forms the district/ subdivision border in the north-western part and then flows through the subdivision. The other important rivers are Mathabhanga and Bhairab. The subdivision slopes in a south-easterly direction and on the east has a long boundary with Bangladesh. The area had large forests. The huge influx of East Bengali refugees that took place in the district immediately after the partition of India and the steady influx ever since paved way for conversion of forest into agricultural land.

Subdivisions
Nadia district is divided into the following administrative subdivisions:

Administrative units
Tehatta subdivision has  5 police stations, 4 community development blocks, 4 panchayat samitis, 36 gram panchayats, 240 mouzas, 217 inhabited villages and 2 census towns. The census towns are: Karimpur and Uttampur.

The subdivision has its headquarters at Tehatta.

Police stations
Police stations in Tehatta subdivision have the following features and jurisdiction:

Blocks
Community development blocks in Tehatta subdivision are:

Gram Panchayats
The subdivision contains 36 gram panchayats under 4 community development blocks:

Karimpur I block consists of eight gram panchayats, viz. Harekrishnapur, Jamsherpur, Karimpur–II, Pipulbaria, Hogolbaria, Karimpur–I, Madhugari and Shikarpur.

Karimpur II block consists of ten gram panchayats, viz. Dhoradaha–I, Murutia, Narayanpur–II, Rahamatpur, Dhoradaha–II, Nandanpur, Natidanga–I, Dighal Kandi, Narayanpur–I and Natidanga&nda

Tehatta I block consists of 11 gram panchayats, viz. Betai–I, Chhitka, Patharghata–I, Shyamnagar, Betai–II, Kanainagar, Patharghata–II, Tehatta, Chanderghat, Natna and Raghunathpur.

Tehatta II block consists of seven gram panchayats, viz. Barnia, Hanspukuria, Palsunda–I, Sahebnagar, Gopinathpur, Palasipara and Palsunda–II.

Education
Nadia district had a literacy rate of 74.97% as per the provisional figures of the census of India 2011. Tehatta subdivision had a literacy rate of 67.25%, Krishnanagar Sadar subdivision 71.03%, Ranaghat subdivision 79.51% and Kalyani subdivision 83.35.  

Given in the table below (data in numbers) is a comprehensive picture of the education scenario in Nadia district for the year 2013-14:

Note: Primary schools include junior basic schools; middle schools, high schools and higher secondary schools include madrasahs; technical schools include junior technical schools, junior government polytechnics, industrial technical institutes, industrial training centres, nursing training institutes etc.; technical and professional colleges include engineering colleges, medical colleges, para-medical institutes, management colleges, teachers training and nursing training colleges, law colleges, art colleges, music colleges etc. Special and non-formal education centres include sishu siksha kendras, madhyamik siksha kendras, centres of Rabindra mukta vidyalaya, recognised Sanskrit tols, institutions for the blind and other handicapped persons, Anganwadi centres, reformatory schools etc.

The following institutions are located in Tehatta subdivision:
Karimpur Pannadevi College was established at Karimpur in 1968. The establishment of the college was possible with the zeal of Dr. Nalinaksha Sanyal, a scholar and politician, and the generous contribution of Durga Prasad Agrawal, a local businessman. It is affiliated to the University of Kalyani. It offers honours courses in English, Bengali, history, political science, philosophy, geography, physics, chemistry, mathematics and accountancy. Some of the courses are self-financing.
Dr. B.R. Ambedkar College was established at Betai in 1973. A local educationist Haran Chandra Biswas played a major role in establishing the college. It is affiliated to the University of Kalyani.  It offers degree courses in arts and commerce.
Tehatta Government College was established at Tehatta in 2014. It is affiliated to the University of Kalyani and offers honours courses in five subjects.

Healthcare
The table below (all data in numbers) presents an overview of the medical facilities available and patients treated in the hospitals, health centres and sub-centres in 2014 in Nadia district.  
 

.* Excluding nursing homes

Medical facilities
Medical facilities in Tehatta subdivision are as follows:

Hospital in Tehatta subdivision: (Name, location, beds)

Tehatta Subdivisional Hospital at Tehatta wuth 68 beds.

Rural Hospitals and BPHC: (Name, block, location, beds) 
Karimpur Rural Hospital, Karimpur I CD Block, Karimpur, 50 beds
Nathidanga Rural Hospital, Karimpur II CD Block, Natidanga, 30 beds
Palashipara (Pritimoyee) Rural Hospital, Tehatta II CD Block, Palashipara, 30 beds

Block Primary Health Centres: (Name, CD block, location, beds)

Nazirpur Block Primary Health Centre, Tehatta I CD Block, Nazirpur, 10 beds

Primary Health Centres (CD Block-wise)(CD Block, PHC location, beds)
Karimpur I CD Block: Sikarpur (10 beds), Bagchi Jamsherpur (10 beds)
Karimpur II CD Block: Nandanpur (10 beds)
Tehatta I CD Block: Kusthia (6 beds), Shyamnagar (10 beds)
Tehatta II CD Block: Barnia (10 beds), Chhota Nalda (6 beds)

Electoral constituencies
Lok Sabha (parliamentary) and Vidhan Sabha (state assembly) constituencies in Tehatta subdivision were as follows:

References 

Subdivisions of West Bengal
Subdivisions in Nadia district